Club de Fútbol Ciudad de Murcia, usually abbreviated to Ciudad de Murcia, was a Spanish football club based in Murcia, in the namesake autonomous community. They played at the 16,000-seater Estadio de La Condomina.

Ciudad Murcia was relocated to Granada and renamed Granada 74 CF after the end of the 2006–07 season.

History
Ciudad de Murcia was formed in the heat of the summer of 1999, when Quique Pina, a former player of Real Murcia, started the club with the help of local businesses and influential friendships.

In the 2003–04 season, the new club first appeared in Segunda División. After reaching as high as a 12th place, it finished 17th, narrowly avoiding relegation, repeating the feat in the following campaign (18th).

Impressive performances, particularly towards the back end of the season, saw Ciudad attain a much higher league standing in 2005–06. Influential players such as José Juan Luque (20 goals) and Daniel Kome helped to keep the club in the promotion picture until the last day, eventually losing out to Levante UD for the third place; in the 2006–07 season, more of the same, but now 13 points behind the last promotee, neighbouring Real Murcia.

On 6 June 2007, Ciudad de Murcia was acquired by an investor from Granada, transferring it to that city and renaming it Granada 74 CF. The players still under contract with Ciudad had the option to cancel their contract or stay on with the newly formed club.

As the second division team moved to Granada, the reserve team, CF Atlético Ciudad, playing in the fourth level, became the club's first team in 2007–08.

Season to season

4 seasons in Segunda División
2 seasons in Segunda División B
1 season in Tercera División

Statistics 2006–07

Top Scorers:
Goitom – 15 goals
Luque – 11 goals
Saizar – 8 goals
Top Goalkeepers:
Jaime Jiménez – 23 goals in 21 matches
José Juan – 20 goals in 20 matches

Notable players

 Rolando Zárate
 Damián Timpani
 Cristian Díaz
 Luciano Becchio
 Turu Flores
 Javier Liendo
 Alexandre
 Thiago Schumacher
 David Eto'o
 Bleriot Heuyot
 Daniel Kome
 Juan Pablo Úbeda
 Romain Ferrier
 Carlos Torres
 João Manuel Pinto
 Marco Almeida
 Leo Lerinc
 Slaviša Jokanović
 Héctor Font
 Javier Camuñas
 Roberto Cuevas
 Ibán Espadas
 Daniel Güiza
 Mikel Lasa
 Mikel Labaka
 Dani Bautista
 José Juan Luque
 Raúl Medina
 Ayoze
 Xabi Jiménez
 Rubén Torrecilla
  Roberto Merino
  Henok Goitom
  Ludovic Assemoassa
 Jonay Hernández
 Miku

Famous coaches
 Juan Manuel Lillo
 Abel Resino
 José Luis Oltra

References

External links
Official website 

 
Defunct football clubs in the Region of Murcia
Association football clubs established in 1999
Association football clubs disestablished in 2007
1999 establishments in Spain
2007 disestablishments in Spain
Segunda División clubs